José María Viesca y Montes (1787–1856) was a lawyer and Mexican politician aligned with federalist ideology, who served as Governor of Coahuila and Texas (1827–1830). His brother, Agustín Viesca, took over the role of governor in 1835.

Early life
Viesca y Montes was born in Villa de Santa María de las Parras, Coahuila. He had at least one brother, Agustín Viesca. He was the uncle of former governor of Coahuila Andrés S. Viesca Bagües and was Regidor of the City of Parras.

Career

He was a member of the delegation of the Internal State East during the Constitutional Convention from 1823 to 1824 and a member of the legislature of Coahuila and Texas in 1824. In 1833 he was senator in the same state.

In 1835, he opposed the centralist regime of Antonio Lopez de Santa Anna and Texas Independence, but he found little support for his federalist ideology. He was elected deputy for the state of Coahuila until the Constituent Congress of 1856. However, sickness prevented him from attending the conference, and he died the same year.

Legacy 
To commemorate both Viesca and Mexican President Anastasio Bustamante, the town of Alamo de Parras, in Coahuila, was named San José de Viesca and Bustamante. The town is now known as Viesca.

References 

1787 births
1856 deaths
19th-century Mexican politicians
Governors of Coahuila
Governors of Mexican Texas
People from Parras, Coahuila
Senators of Mexico